How Deep, How High, is an album by saxophonist Warne Marsh and pianist Sal Mosca recorded in concert in 1976 and studio in 1979 and released on the Interplay label.

Reception 

The Rolling Stone Jazz Record Guide commented: "How Deep, How High reunites Marsh with another Tristano student, pianist Sal Mosca, for a re-examination of academic roots. The dedication to a fluid, melodic concept remains intact, but gone is the strict adherence to a lightly colored tone". The Allmusic review states "The music ranges from introspective to more driving, but it swings throughout, and Marsh's solos are always intriguing".

Track listing 
All compositions by Warne Marsh except where noted
 "The Hard Way" (Sal Mosca) – 4:03
 "Noteworthy" – 4:21
 "Finishing Touch" (Mosca) – 3:41
 "How Deep, How High" – 4:30
 "Background Music" – 7:01
 "She's Funny That Way" (Neil Moret, Richard A. Whiting) – 8:05
Recorded at Sarah Lawrence College, Bronxville, NY on April 25, 1976 (tracks 5 & 6) and at Sal Mosca's Studio in Mount Vernon, NY on May 2, 1979 (tracks 1 & 2) and August 8, 1979 (tracks 3 & 4)

Personnel 
Warne Marsh – tenor saxophone
Sal Mosca – piano
Sam Jones – bass (tracks 5 & 6)
Roy Haynes – drums (tracks 5 & 6)

References 

Warne Marsh albums
Sal Mosca albums
1980 albums
Interplay Records albums